Bracken is an unincorporated community in Comal County, Texas, United States.  It lies along the eastern bank of Cibolo Creek, southwest of New Braunfels. The community is found in close proximity to Garden Ridge, and is included in the Greater San Antonio area.

Geography

It is considered a part of the Texas Hill Country.

Bracken Cave is found near the town and is notable for housing the largest collection of Mexican free-tailed bats in the world, numbering 20 million in habitation during spring migration. As a result, the cave also holds the record for the largest known concentration of mammals in the world. These bats have ventured to the cave for 10,000 years, helping the local agrarian economy by controlling the insect population.

History
William Bracken, for whom the town was named, purchased  of land in the area in 1849 after receiving a grant from Governor Peter Hansborough Bell.  Originally the town was known as Davenport, named for  James G. Davenport, a landowner who settled in the area in 1868. The Davenport family cemetery still stands on the western bank of Cibolo Creek. To account for the growth of the city as construction began on the International and Great Northern Railroad, the establishment of a post office was requested in 1883.  However, a Davenport Post Office already existed elsewhere in Texas, forcing the town to change its name to Bracken, after the early settler. Eventually, the town was given a post office.

Following the completion of the railroad in 1890, a depot was built as well as a ticket stand. Soon, saloons lined the town's seven blocks, which expanded to thirteen near the turn of the century. Stores and other businesses including a blacksmith, cotton gin and lumberyard sprung up as well, contributing to the booming railroad economy. A dance hall, notorious for fights, was the center of entertainment until 1915, when a bowling alley was opened.

After the passage of the 18th Amendment to the United States Constitution implementing Prohibition, the town suffered a steep decline. Businesses left town and the general store burned to the ground. Prior to World War II, the Post Office was closed. In 1970, the town's population stood at 75, and remained the same for the next twenty years.  In 2000, it had increased to 76 individuals.

Education
The residents of Bracken belong to the Comal Independent School District. Following World War II, Davenport School, which educated the town's children, was consolidated with schools in Solms and Danville to create Comal Elementary School.

References

Unincorporated communities in Comal County, Texas
Unincorporated communities in Texas
Greater San Antonio